Sergiu Dadu (born 23 January 1981) is a Moldovan former footballer who played as a striker. He was also a member of Moldova national football team.

Club career
Dadu was born in Chişinău. He started his career at Sheriff Tiraspol and was loaned to Constructorul Chişinău in January 2002. He played the league rival until January 2003. In summer 2003, he left on loan to Alania Vladikavkaz along with Cristian Tudor.

Dadu was left for CSKA Moscow in summer 2004, but left on loan to Alania Vladikavkaz again in 2005 season.

International career
He played 5 games in UEFA Euro 2008 Qualifying and 9 games in 2006 FIFA World Cup qualification (UEFA).

International goals
Scores and results list Moldova's goal tally first.

References

External links
 National Team profile at rsssf.com
 Career statistics
 
 
 

Moldovan footballers
Moldovan expatriate footballers
Moldova international footballers
FC Sheriff Tiraspol players
Moldovan Super Liga players
FC Tiraspol players
FC Spartak Vladikavkaz players
PFC CSKA Moscow players
FC Midtjylland players
Expatriate footballers in Russia
Expatriate men's footballers in Denmark
Footballers from Chișinău
1981 births
Living people
Russian Premier League players
Association football forwards